Susana Ben Susón, nicknamed La Susona, was a young Jewish convert from Seville and features in a legend. She was the daughter of don Diego Susón a Jewish convert.

Jews were an oppressed minority in Seville in the late Middle Ages and in 1391 a violent pogrom in the Jewish quarter (la Judería) reduced the Jewish population of 500 families by two thirds through forced conversions, expulsion and murder. In 1478 the Inquisition was founded in Spain to uphold religious orthodoxy in the Spanish realm and to monitor and prevent conversos from engaging in Jewish practices, which, as Christians, they were supposed to have given up.

In an attempt to secure their continued existence and regain their previous standing in Spanish life, around 1480, the Jews in Seville, Carmona, and Utrera plotted a conspiracy to destabilize the state and one of its leaders was the father of Susona. The conspirators met at the home of Diego Susón to plot the spread of their plans, including the release of prisoners to create disorder, benefit the Muslim powers, and carry out violent uprisings in major cities.

However, Susona feared the direction the conspiracy was unfolding, she told everything to her young husband Christian.

Christian went to the chief assistant of the city of Seville, don Diego de Merlo, to inform him of what Susona had told him. Diego de Merlo investigated the allegations and arrested all participants, who were condemned to death.

Susona suffered great guilt for having betrayed her father and hid herself in a convent. On the death of Diego Susón, she requested her head to be hung from the door of her house in the Barrio Santa Cruz Seville, to remind people of her betrayal. However, the head decomposed and was replaced by an oil lamp. Subsequently, the lamp was changed to a tile on which her skull is displayed.

La Bella Susona in a tile of a roundabout Maria Luisa Park of Seville, Spain. The tile is based on a painting by José García Ramos and is drawn by Enrique Orcel in the Factory of Manuel Ramos Rejano.

References 

ben Suson
ben Suson
ben Suson